There are ten species of Orthoptera native to Ireland, seven grasshoppers and three bush-crickets . A further species, the mole cricket, is thought to be possibly extirpated, given only one record from 1920.

Family: Acrididae

Subfamily: Gomphocerinae (slant-faced grasshoppers)
Genus: Chorthippus
Lesser marsh grasshopper Chorthippus albomarginatus
Common field grasshopper Chorthippus brunneus
Genus: Myrmeleotettix
Mottled Grasshopper Myrmeleotettix maculatus
Genus: Omocestus
Common Green Grasshopper Omocestus viridulus

Subfamily: Oedipodinae (bandwings)
Genus: Stethophyma
Large Marsh Grasshopper Stethophyma grossum

Family: Phaneropteridae

Tribe: Barbitistini
Genus: Leptophyes
Speckled bush-cricket Leptophyes punctatissima

Family: Tettigoniidae

Subfamily: Meconematinae
Genus: Meconema
Southern oak bush cricket. Meconema meridionale

Subfamily: Tettigoniinae
Genus: Metrioptera
Roesel's bush-cricket Metrioptera roeselii

Family: Tetrigidae (pygmy grasshoppers)

Subfamily: Tetriginae
Genus: Tetrix
Slender Ground-hopper Tetrix subulata
Common Ground-hopper Tetrix undulata

Family: Gryllotalpidae (mole crickets) 
Genus: Gryllotalpa
European mole cricket Gryllotalpa gryllotalpa possibly extirpated

References

W. D. Hincks, 1949  Handbooks For The Identification of British Insects: Vol. I Part 5 Dermaptera and Orthoptera Royal Entomological Society of London online as pdf

External links

Ireland, orthoptera
orthop